George Barnett (11 February 1876 – 10 April 1965) was an Irish historian, archaeologist, botanist, geologist, folklorist and poet. Self-taught, he acquired a vast knowledge of the Sperrin Mountains through experience, experimentation, observation, and traditional lore. He discovered many prehistoric sites, although he is best known for his discovery of the Beaghmore stone circles, and developed the theory that they were an ancient lunar observatory. This theory was expressed in his poem, The Beaghmore Stone Circles.

The Beaghmore Stone Circles 
Ceremonial occasions they often had there,
They knew every day, aye, and week in the year,
For fifty-two weeks they had stones in a ring,
Thirteen in a line for the time the call Spring.

The same for Summer, that time of great joy,
Twenty-six for the Autumn and Winter stands nigh,
Four stones that are bigger stand up in a line,
For midsummer sunrise and midwinter time.

One stone by the circle's a day it appears,
Another convenient makes out the leap years,
You can soon make them out, if you look the place o'er,
Twixt the eastern circle and mighty big four.

Field work
Well known to academics for his extensive local knowledge and experience of the Sperrins, he assisted many field expeditions, and is recognised in the published findings. Upon his death, Professor E.E. Evans, Ireland's first professor of Geography, wrote:

Pen name
In the 1920s, he used the pen name G.B. M'Keown (M'Keown being his mother's maiden name), when writing notes for the weekly column 'Nature and Antiquarian Notes' in the Northern Whig Newspaper. On 19 November 1927 his real identity was revealed to the public.

References

External links
Ulster History Circle: George Barnett

Further reading

1876 births
1965 deaths
20th-century Irish historians
Irish archaeologists
20th-century Irish geologists